Trotta is a 1971 West German film directed by Johannes Schaaf. It is based on the 1938 novel Die Kapuzinergruft (The Emperor's Tomb) by Austrian author Joseph Roth. It was chosen as West Germany's official submission to the 45th Academy Awards for Best Foreign Language Film, but did not manage to receive a nomination. It was also entered into the 1972 Cannes Film Festival.

Cast
 András Bálint - Trotta
 Elma Bulla
 Rosemarie Fendel - Almarin
 István Iglódi
 Doris Kunstmann - Elisabeth Kovacs
 Tamás Major
 Liliana Nelska
 Mari Törőcsik

See also
 List of submissions to the 45th Academy Awards for Best Foreign Language Film
 List of German submissions for the Academy Award for Best Foreign Language Film

References

External links

1971 films
West German films
1970s German-language films
Films directed by Johannes Schaaf
Films set in Austria
Films based on Austrian novels
Films based on works by Joseph Roth
Lesbian-related films
Works about Austria-Hungary
Films set in the 1910s
Constantin Film films
1970s historical drama films
German historical drama films
1971 drama films
Films set in Austria-Hungary
1970s German films